Riley Nelson (born November 8, 1977) is a Canadian former professional ice hockey player who most notably played 11 seasons for minor league team, the Colorado Eagles in the ECHL. He is the all-time franchise leader in goals, assists and points for the Eagles. On announcing his retirement the Eagles immediately pronounced that his number 12 jersey would be retired and raised to the rafters during the 2014–15 season on December 12, 2014.

Nelson took up a job in the Oil and Gas industry and remains tied to the Eagles as the club's video coach.

Career statistics

Awards and honours
2010–11 All-CHL Team.

References

External links

1977 births
Canadian expatriate ice hockey players in the United States
Canadian ice hockey centres
Colorado Eagles players
Columbus Cottonmouths (CHL) players
Knoxville Speed players
Living people
Michigan Tech Huskies men's ice hockey players
Missouri River Otters players
Rochester Americans players
San Antonio Rampage players